A multi-compartment model is a type of mathematical model used for describing the way materials or energies are transmitted among the compartments of a system. Sometimes, the physical system that we try to model in equations is too complex, so it is much easier to discretize the problem and reduce the number of parameters. Each compartment is assumed to be a homogeneous entity within which the entities being modeled are equivalent. A multi-compartment model is classified as a lumped parameters model. Similar to more general mathematical models, multi-compartment models can treat variables as continuous, such as a differential equation, or as discrete, such as a Markov chain. Depending on the system being modeled, they can be treated as stochastic or deterministic.

Multi-compartment models are used in many fields including pharmacokinetics, epidemiology, biomedicine, systems theory, complexity theory, engineering, physics, information science and social science. The circuits systems can be viewed as a multi-compartment model as well. Most commonly, the mathematics of multi-compartment models is simplified to provide only a single parameter—such as concentration—within a compartment.

In Systems Theory 
In systems theory, it involves the description of a network whose components are compartments that represent a population of elements that are equivalent with respect to the manner in which they process input signals to the compartment.
Instant homogeneous distribution of materials or energies within a "compartment."
The exchange rate of materials or energies among the compartments is related to the densities of these compartments.
Usually, it is desirable that the materials do not undergo chemical reactions while transmitting among the compartments.
When concentration of the cell is of interest, typically the volume is assumed to be constant over time, though this may not be totally true in reality.

Single-compartment model 

Possibly the simplest application of multi-compartment model is in the single-cell concentration monitoring (see the figure above). If the volume of a cell is V, the mass of solute is q, the input is u(t) and the secretion of the solution is proportional to the density of it within the cell, then the concentration of the solution C within the cell over time is given by

Where k is the proportionality.

Software 
Simulation Analysis and Modeling 2 SAAM II is a software system designed specifically to aid in the development and testing of multi-compartment models. It has a user-friendly graphical user interface
wherein compartmental models are constructed by creating a visual representation of the model. From this model, the program automatically creates systems of ordinary differential equations. The program can both
simulate and fit models to data, returning optimal parameter estimates and associated statistics. It was developed by scientists working on metabolism and hormones kinetics (e.g., glucose, lipids, or insulin). It was then used for tracer studies and pharmacokinetics. Albeit a multi-compartment model can in principle be developed and run via other software, like MATLAB or C++ languages, the user interface offered by SAAM II allows the modeler (and non-modelers) to better control the system, especially when the complexity increases.

Discrete Compartmental Model 
Discrete models are concerned with discrete variables, often a time interval . An example of a discrete multi-compartmental model is a discrete version of the Lotka–Volterra Model. The compartments are coupled to each other by mass action terms in each equation. Over a discrete time-step , we get

Here

 the  term represents the birth of prey;
 the mass action term  is the number of prey dying due to predators;
 the mass action term  represents the birth of predators as a function of prey eaten;
 the  term is the death of predators;

These equations are easily solved iteratively.

Continuous Compartmental Model 

This yields a system of ordinary differential equations. Treating this model as differential equations allows the implementation of calculus methods to study the dynamics of the system more in-depth.

Multi-Compartment Model
As the number of compartments increases, the model can be very complex and the solutions usually beyond ordinary calculation.

The formulae for n-cell multi-compartment models become:
 

Where 

Or in matrix forms:
 

Where

In the special case of a closed system (see below) i.e. where  then there is a general solution.

 

So
 

Where
  for 

This solution can be rearranged:

 

This somewhat inelegant equation demonstrates that all solutions of an n-cell multi-compartment model with constant or no inputs are of the form:

 

Where

Model topologies
Generally speaking, as the number of compartments increases, it is challenging both to find the algebraic and numerical solutions to the model. However, there are special cases of models, which rarely exist in nature, when the topologies exhibit certain regularities that the solutions become easier to find. The model can be classified according to the interconnection of cells and input/output characteristics:

Closed model: No sinks or source, lit. all koi = 0 and ui = 0;
Open model: There are sinks or/and sources among cells.
Catenary model: All compartments are arranged in a chain, with each pool connecting only to its neighbors. This model has two or more cells.
Cyclic model: It's a special case of the catenary model, with three or more cells, in which the first and last cell are connected, i.e. k1n ≠ 0 or/and kn1 ≠ 0.
Mammillary model: Consists of a central compartment with peripheral compartments connecting to it. There are no interconnections among other compartments. 
Reducible model: It's a set of unconnected models. It bears great resemblance to the computer concept of forest as against trees.

See also 
 Mathematical model 
 Biomedical engineering
 Biological neuron models
 Compartmental models in epidemiology
 Physiologically-based pharmacokinetic modelling

References

Godfrey, K., Compartmental Models and Their Application, Academic Press, 1983.
Anderson, D. H., Compartmental Modeling and Tracer Kinetics, Springer-Verlag Lecture Notes in Biomathematics #50, 1983.
Jacquez, J. A, Compartmental Analysis in Biology and Medicine, 2nd ed., The University of Michigan Press, 1985.
Evans, W. C., Linear Systems, Compartmental Modeling, and Estimability Issues in IAQ Studies, in Tichenor, B., Characterizing Sources of Indoor Air Pollution and Related Sink Effects, ASTM STP 1287, pp. 239–262, 1996.

Mathematical modeling
Systems theory